Cables Lake is a small lake north-northwest of Roscoe in Delaware County, New York. It drains south via an unnamed creek which flows into Russell Brook.

See also
 List of lakes in New York

References 

Lakes of New York (state)
Lakes of Delaware County, New York